Luampa District is a district of Zambia, located in Western Province. It was separated from Kaoma District in 2012.

References

Districts of Western Province, Zambia